Peter Slabakov (24 April 1923 – 17 May 2009) was a Bulgarian actor. He had appeared in 85 films since 1960. His last film was Investigation (2006). His son Andrei Slabakov is an actor, film director, and Member of the European Parliament.

Right after the fall of the communist regime in Bulgaria in 1989, he was elected member of the 7th Grand National Assembly of Bulgaria on the ballot of the right-wing Union of Democratic Forces. Slabakov served as MP again from 1995 to 1997 as part of the parliamentary group of the green and emblematic for the democratic changes in Bulgaria Ekoglasnost party.

He died on 17 May 2009 at the age of 86.

Selected filmography
 Tobacco (1962)
 Captive Flock (1962)
 Torrid Noon (1966)
 The Tied Up Balloon (1967)
 Tango (1969)
 Dawn Over the Drava (1971)
 A Cricket in the Ear (1976)
 The Swimming Pool (1977)
 Investigation (2006)

References

External links

1923 births
2009 deaths
Bulgarian male film actors
Members of the National Assembly (Bulgaria)
People from Lyaskovets
20th-century Bulgarian male actors
Union of Democratic Forces (Bulgaria) politicians